USS LST-945 was an  in the United States Navy. Like many of her class, she was not named and is properly referred to by her hull designation.

Construction and career
LST-945 was laid down on 11 August 1944, at Hingham, Massachusetts, by the Bethlehem-Hingham Shipyard; launched on 16 September 1944; and commissioned on 9 October 1944.

During World War II LST-945 was assigned to the Asiatic-Pacific theater and participated in the assault and occupation of Okinawa Gunto from April through June 1945.

Following the war, she saw service in China until early 1946. The ship returned to the United States and was decommissioned on 16 April 1946, and transferred to the Maritime Commission (MARCOM) for disposition on 29 May, that same year. She was struck from the Navy list on 19 July 1946.

Awards
LST-945 earned one battle star for World War II service.

Notes

Citations

Bibliography 

Online resources

External links
 

 

1944 ships
LST-542-class tank landing ships
Ships built in Hingham, Massachusetts
World War II amphibious warfare vessels of the United States